Jayakodi Arachchilage Lochana Hansamali Jayakodi (born 24 September 1994), popularly known as Lochi, is a Sri Lankan Internet celebrity, YouTuber, dancer, model, actress and television presenter. Started her career in 2016 with the brand name Lochi, she later became a popular figure in TikTok, YouTube, and other social media.

Personal life 
She was born on 24 September 1994 in Piliyandala, Colombo, Sri Lanka as the eldest child in a family. Her father Kapila Susira Kumara is a male nurse at Apeksha Cancer Hospital, Maharagama. Her mother Indrani Arugamage was a housewife, who died in 2014 from a lung infection. Lochana has two younger sisters: Dhanushika Madhushani and Rumesha Ushani. She completed her primary education at Piliyandala Junior School and later attended Dharmasena Attigala Girls School for Ordinary Levels. She completed A/Ls from Buddhist Girls College, Mount Lavinia.

Career
Before starting her social media career, Lochana worked as a dancer with a Certified Zumba Instructor Network (ZIN). Following the YouTube videos of Lele Pons, she had the intentions to become a Sri Lankan internet celebrity. After the death of her mother, she started to join a dancing group where she continued to dance as a professional dancer for many popular dance troupes in Sri Lanka.

Then in 2016, Lochana started her digital content creation with a TikTok account through the 'Musically app'. Her first TikTok video was a dancing act along with one of her friends. In the meantime, she made two more dance acts and received good feedback from the followers. Her first viral video was a Bollywood dance act. Later in 2018, she started to do comedy videos in TikTok. Through her TikTok profile titled 'lochanajayakodi''', she made dance, comedy, and lip-sync videos where she became a popular figure in social networks has gained over 850,000 followers on TikTok.

Apart from digital content creation, she has acted in a stage play, when she was at the age of 12. Then she also acted in a television serial, still not telecast. Then in August 2018, she started to follow YouTube and released many comedy videos along with Kelum Devanarayana. Lochana has also made several appearances in television commercials such as Signal, Lemon puff, Ritzbury bubbles, Munchee, and People's Bank. She also worked as a presenter for the television youth program 'Y-cafe' telecast on Sirasa TV. Meanwhile, in 2021, she received a letter from parliamentarian Suren Raghavan by citing that he will help Lochana for her future endeavors. In the same year 2021, she made her maiden television acting with the serial Race'' telecast on Siyatha TV, where she played the role "Randuli". Currently she owned a 360 degree digital marketing agency "Lochi Studios pvt. Ltd.".

By the end of May 2021, Lochi surpassed 452,000 subscribers on her YouTube channel.

See also
 List of YouTube personalities

References

External links
 Lochana Jayakodi on TikTok
 Lochi on YouTube

Living people
1994 births
Sri Lankan television personalities
21st-century Sri Lankan people
Charity fundraisers (people)
Comedy-related YouTube channels
Comedy YouTubers
Vlogs-related YouTube channels
YouTube channels launched in 2018
YouTube vloggers